Hillcrest Commando was a light infantry regiment of the South African Army. It formed part of the South African Army Infantry Formation as well as the South African Territorial Reserve.
Hillcrest was a Commando from 1962 to 1983 and was the first English commando in Pretoria. Hillcrest was however a Regiment from 1983 to 2003.

Origin

Hillcrest's two tailed lion
Hillcrest was an exclusive English speaking unit, but on the Minister of Defense's persistence that they should speak both official languages it was decided to " instead of one tail, our lion will have two tails as the Minister insisted". This is a play on words as the Afrikaans word for languages is Tale.

Operations

With the SADF

Area of Responsibility
As a commando, Hillcrest deployed as far north as Rhodesia.

Commando to Regiment
Hillcrest became a Regiment in 1983 whereafter it did border camps in the Far North Command.

Hillcrest was assigned to Group 29 at Ellisras and to the Soutpansberg Military Area near Messina as part of 73 Brigade and as part of Far North Command Pietersburg

In March 1994, the Regiment supplied platoons to assist the SADF in resolving the AWB/Bophuthatswana civil unrest.

In April 1994, the Regiment called up 3 companies for duty in the East Rand and Johannesburg after the 29 March Shell House massacre.

With the SANDF
The Regiment was part of the first National Defence Force parade held in Pietersburg on 11 November 1994.

Amalgamation into Tshwane Regiment
In December 2002, Regiment Hillcrest with other structures in the Greater Pretoria area was amalgamated into the new Tshwane Regiment.

Leadership 

1962: Cmdt M. Malone
1984: Cmdt W. Louw
Last OC: Lt Col Brenton Geach
1994: RSM Tertius Zitzke

Dress Insignia

References

See also 
 South African Commando System

Infantry regiments of South Africa
South African Commando Units
Disbanded military units and formations in Pretoria